Thierry Tulasne was the defending champion, but was forced to retire in his first round match against Gustavo Tiberti.

Mats Wilander won the title by defeating Henrik Sundström 6–4, 6–4 in the final.

Seeds

Draw

Finals

Top half

Bottom half

References

External links
 Official results archive (ATP)
 Official results archive (ITF)

Men's Singles
Singles